The 2022 UEFA Women's Under-19 Championship (also known as UEFA Women's Under-19 Euro 2022) was the 19th edition of the UEFA Women's Under-19 Championship (23rd edition if the Under-18 era is included), the annual international youth football championship organised by UEFA for the women's under-19 national teams of Europe. The Czech Republic hosted the tournament. A total of eight teams played in the tournament, with players born on or after 1 January 2003 eligible to participate.

France were the defending champions, having won the last tournament held in 2019, with the 2020 and 2021 editions cancelled due to the COVID-19 pandemic in Europe. France was eliminated in the semifinals.

Host selection
The timeline of host selection was as follows:
11 January 2019: bidding procedure launched
28 February 2019: deadline to express interest
27 March 2019: Announcement by UEFA that declaration of interest were received from 17 member associations to host one of the UEFA national team youth final tournaments (UEFA European Under-19 Championship, UEFA Women's Under-19 Championship, UEFA European Under-17 Championship, UEFA Women's Under-17 Championship) in 2021 and 2022 (although it was not specified which association were interested in which tournament)
28 June 2019: Submission of bid dossiers
24 September 2019: Selection of successful host associations by the UEFA Executive Committee at its meeting in Ljubljana

For the UEFA European Women's Under-19 Championship final tournaments of 2021 and 2022, Belarus and Czech Republic were selected as hosts respectively.

Qualification

The UEFA Executive Committee approved on 18 June 2020 a new qualifying format for the Women's Under-17 and Under-19 Championship starting from 2022. The qualifying competition will be played in two rounds, with teams divided into two leagues, and promotion and relegation between leagues after each round similar to the UEFA Nations League.

A record total of 52 (out of 55) UEFA nations entered the qualifying competition, with the hosts Czech Republic also competing despite already qualifying automatically, and seven teams will qualify for the final tournament at the end of round 2 to join the hosts. The draw for round 1 was held on 11 March 2021, 15:00 CET (UTC+1), at the UEFA headquarters in Nyon, Switzerland.

Qualified teams
The following eight teams qualified for the final tournament.

1 Bold indicates champions for that year. Italic indicates hosts for that year.

Final draw
The final draw was held on 18 May 2022, 10:30 CET, at Clarion Congress Hotel in Ostrava, the Czech Republic. The eight teams were drawn into two groups of four teams. There were no seeding, except that the hosts Czech Republic were assigned to position A1 in the draw.

Venues

Squads

Each national team have to submit a squad of 20 players, two of whom had to be goalkeepers (Regulations Article 43.01).

Group stage
The group winners and runners-up advanced to the semi-finals.

Tiebreakers
In the group stage, teams were ranked according to points (3 points for a win, 1 point for a draw, 0 points for a loss), and if tied on points, the following tiebreaking criteria were applied, in the order given, to determine the rankings (Regulations Articles 20.01 and 20.02):
Points in head-to-head matches among tied teams;
Goal difference in head-to-head matches among tied teams;
Goals scored in head-to-head matches among tied teams;
If more than two teams were tied, and after applying all head-to-head criteria above, a subset of teams were still tied, all head-to-head criteria above were reapplied exclusively to that subset of teams;
Goal difference in all group matches;
Goals scored in all group matches;
Penalty shoot-out if only two teams had the same number of points, and they met in the last round of the group and were tied after applying all criteria above (not used if more than two teams had the same number of points, or if their rankings were not relevant for qualification for the next stage);
Disciplinary points (red card = 3 points, yellow card = 1 point, expulsion for two yellow cards in one match = 3 points);
Higher position in the qualification round 2 league ranking

All times are local, CEST (UTC+2).

Group A

Group B

Knockout stage
In the knockout stage, extra time and penalty shoot-out will be used to decide the winner if necessary.

Bracket

Semi-finals

Final

Goalscorers

References

External links

2022
Women's Under-19 Championship
2022 Uefa Women's Under-19 Championship
2021–22 in Czech football
2022 in women's association football
2022 in youth association football
UEFA
UEFA